is a Japanese footballer who plays for Shonan Bellmare.

Career statistics
Last update: 9 July 2022.

References

External links
Profile at Vegalta Sendai
Profile at Kawasaki Frontale

1993 births
Living people
University of Tsukuba alumni
Association football people from Kagoshima Prefecture
Japanese footballers
J1 League players
Kawasaki Frontale players
Vegalta Sendai players
Hokkaido Consadole Sapporo players
Sagan Tosu players
Shonan Bellmare players
Association football midfielders